Romanian Football Federation, also known by its acronym FRF, is the governing body of football in Romania. They are headquartered in the capital city of Bucharest and affiliated to FIFA and UEFA since 1923 and 1955 respectively. The Federation organizes the men's national team and the women's national team, as well as most of the Romanian football competitions.

History 

In 1909, the first governing body for the activity of football players appeared, the Association of Sports Clubs in Romania, which later became the "Association of Football Clubs", with headquarters in Bucharest and Mario Gebauer as president. Also in 1909, the first national football championship begins, which will be won, in the spring of the following year, by "Olimpia" Bucharest, which was the first team established in Romania in 1904.

On December 1, 1912, the "Association of Football Clubs" will join the Central Football Association Commission (president Mario Gebaur, secretary Lazăr Breyer), which in turn was part of the Federation of Romanian Sports Associations (FSSR), also established in 1912 .

The "Venus" Bucharest and "Prahova" Ploiesti teams will appear in 1915; "Student Sports" Bucharest, in 1916; CA Oradea and "Chinese" Timisoara in 1910, and AMFA Arad, in 1911, according to the "Encyclopedia of Physical Education and Sport in Romania". The Romanian national team began its activity on June 8, 1922, in a match in Belgrade, against Yugoslavia, winning 2-1.

On May 20, 1923, the Association Football Commission of the FSSR was admitted to the Zurich Congress as a member of FIFA. In this capacity, Romania participates in the Olympic Football Tournament from the 1924 Olympic Games held in Paris. On February 16, 1930, the Central Football Association Commission was transformed into the Romanian Football Association Federation (FRFA) , an independent body with legal authority, deciding Romania's participation in the World Championship in Uruguay in July of the same year.

The first president of the FRFA was the lawyer Aurel Leucutia (1930-1933), who has the merit of having organized the first unitary championship of the first division (1932-1933), states the website of the Romanian Football Federation, www.frf.ro.

The domestic championship, Division A, began with the 1932-1933 edition, initially being divided into two series. In 1934 Division B appeared; in 1936, Division C; and in 1937, the National Junior Championship. The political events at the end of 1989 determined essential organizational changes, as well as regarding the football activity.

In the competitive year 1990-1991, a massive group of the most valuable Romanian players went abroad, being requested by big continental clubs.

On February 23, 1991, the General Assembly of the FRF adopted the new statute, elected the federal council, and by court decision no. 290, of April 12, 1991, FR de Fotbal became a legal entity under private law, equivalent to autonomy and thus having the path open to professionalism, mentions the "Encyclopedia of Physical Education and Sport in Romania". On August 1, 1991, through a decision of the Government, the transition to professionalism was approved. From 1930 until the current president of the Federation, there were 28 other leaders of the FRF. Among them, the prefect of the Capital in the 30s, Gabriel Marinescu (1936-1940), the engineer, sports journalist and coach Virgil Economu (1946-1947), the politician Corneliu Mănescu (1958-1960), the former great player of the CCA, Gheorghe Popescu (1963-1967), Mircea Angelescu (1969-1975 and 1986-1989), Andrei Rădulescu (1989-1990), Mircea Pascu (Jan. 1990-Aug. 1990), Mircea Sandu, (Aug. 1990-Mar. 2014).

Currently, the Romanian Football Federation is led by Răzvan Burleanu (since March 2014). FRF organized the national football championship year after year until 1997, when it was decided to take over and organize it by the Professional Football League (LPF).

The Romanian Football Federation is a founding member of the European Football Association (UEFA) since 1954.

Honours

National teams 
 FIFA World Cup
 Quarter-finals (1): 1994
 Round of 16 (4): 1934, 1938, 1990, 1998
 UEFA European Football Championship
 Quarter-finals (1): 2000
 Football at the Summer Olympics
 Fifth-place (1): 1964
 Round of 16 (1): 1924
 Balkan Cup:
 Winners (4) – Record: 1929–31, 1933, 1936, 1977–80
 Runners-up (1): 1973–76

National youth teams 

 UEFA European Under-19 Football Championship
 Under-19 era, 2002–present

 Champions (0):
 Runner-up (0):

 Under-18 era, 1957–2001

 Champions (1): 1962
 Runner-up (1): 1960

Presidents

Notes

References

External links
Official website
Romania at FIFA
Romania at UEFA

Romania
Football in Romania
Futsal in Romania
Football
Sports organizations established in 1909
1909 establishments in Romania